Paul Tobey (born September 7, 1962) is a Canadian jazz pianist, as well as a producer, arranger, composer, and director.

He has toured and recorded with Terry Clark, Jim Vivian, Pat Labarbera, Alex Dean, and has headlined in 16 countries. He has toured Canada several times, including a University bound tour to promote jazz education. In 2006, Tobey made his debut with symphony, launching the Road to Santiago Suite, 9 movements for piano and symphony. He was the first Canadian to sign with Arkadia.

Tobey has been nominated for a Juno Award for Best Jazz Contemporary Album, and has won several awards including Jazz Album of the Year, Pianist of the Year, and the IAJE Award for Service to Jazz Education. He has also been awarded several cash awards for touring, composition, recording etc. from prestigious entities such as Canada Council for the Arts, The Foundation to Assist Canadian Talent on Record, Ontario Arts Council and Canadian Heritage.

Partnered with the Expositor (an Osprey Media Newspaper) in 2006, Tobey lends his talents to an annual "Christmas Traditions" songbook and sing-a-long CD in support of the Sunshine Dreams for Kids.

Tobey is also a strong advocate creating awareness of preventable tinnitus, educating people against hearing loss and ear damage. In 2004 he launched his book Tinnitus Free Living, which includes audio downloads and workbooks.

Discography 

2007 Paul Tobey: The Road to Santiago Suite Produced by Pilgrim Productions Incorporated
Movements for Piano and Symphony
Produced, Composed and Symphony arrangements
Paul Tobey
Supported by Canada Council for the Arts

2006 Paul Tobey: Live at the Glenn Gould Theatre
Produced by Pilgrim Productions Incorporated
Solo Piano
Supported by Ontario Arts Council

2005 Paul Tobey: Christmas at the Piano
Produced by Pilgrim Productions Incorporated
Supported by Ontario Arts Council
Recorded in Toronto Live Nov.23/2005
Featuring: Paul Tobey on Piano
Bass: Henry Heilig
Drums: Steve Heathcoate
Percussion: Dave Simpson
Keyboard: Phil Gray
Flute/Alto: Don Englert
Engineered: Michael Jack
Assistant: Matt Smith

2003 Paul Tobey: Live at the Sanderson Centre

Produced by Pilgrim Productions Incorporated
Piano: Paul Tobey
Keyboards: Douglas Romanow
Alto Sax & Flute: Roy Styffe
Bass: Russ Boswell
Drums: Gary Craig
Guests: Arcady Strings featuring Kenin McKay, Jennifer Hedican, Lucy-Ana Gaston
Brant County Youth Singers Choir Director: Doreen Janzen & Lisa Dawdy Kennette
Live in Concert Produced by Bruce Davidson, Tanglewood Productions
Recording Produced by :Paul Tobey

 2001 Paul Tobey: Street Culture (Arkadia Jazz)
Juno Nominated
Paul Tobey Piano
Mike Murley - Tenor
Jim Vivian - Bass
Terry Clarke - Drums
Supported by Canada Council for the Arts

1998 Paul Tobey: Wayward
Produced by JazzSol Records
Distribution FusionIII Montreal
Featuring Musicians: Alex Dean, Pat LaBarbera, John Johnson, John MacLeod, Sandy Barter, Terry Promane, Rob Somerville, Roy Patterson, Neil Swainson, Roberto Occhipinti, Mark McLean, Armando Borg
Supported by FACTOR
 
1994 Paul Tobey: Orpheus
Produced by JazzSol Records
Solo Piano
Featuring: Paul Tobey on Piano
Bass: Steve Holy
Drums: Jim Hillman
Guitar: Pierre Cote

References

External links 
 Tobey's promotional site
 Tobey's training company site  Among the topics: search engine marketing, public speaking, and life skills.
 Record Label Page

1962 births
Living people
Canadian jazz pianists
Canadian jazz composers
Male jazz composers
Canadian male pianists
21st-century Canadian pianists
21st-century Canadian male musicians